SOP is a Philippine television variety show broadcast by GMA Network. It premiered on February 2, 1997, replacing GMA Supershow. The show concluded on February 28, 2010, with a total of 672 episodes. It was replaced by Party Pilipinas in its timeslot.

History
After GMA Supershow's month-long farewell in January 1997, SOP started airing on February 2, 1997, with a live episode from the GMA Broadway studios. Regular dancers include the VIP Dancers, Universal Motion Dancers, Abstract Dancers and Kidz at Work; with Al Quinn as director and German Moreno as production consultant.

In 2005, the entire cast of SOP and SOP Gigsters together with Mel Tiangco, Joey de Leon, Richard Gomez and German Moreno went to San Francisco, California, United States, for the launch of GMA Pinoy TV.

The show moved to a new set at GMA Network Center Annex, Studio 7 in November 2008. It is one of the biggest studios in the Philippines accommodating 1,000-member audiences.

Cast

 Ogie Alcasid 
 Janno Gibbs 
 Vina Morales 
 G. Toengi 
 Cacai Velasquez 
 Regine Velasquez 
 Gary Valenciano 
 Jaya

Co-hosts and performers

 604
 Carla Abellana 
 Aljur Abrenica 
 Marvin Agustin 
 Marco Alcaraz
 Bernadette Allyson-Estrada 
 Bobby Andrews 
 Aryana 
 Roxanne Barcelo 
 Kris Bernal 
 James Blanco 
 Nancy Castiglione 
 Billy Crawford 
 Chico and Delamar
 Glaiza de Castro 
 Chris Cayzer  
 Ryza Cenon 
 Marky Cielo 
 Jake Cuenca 
 Anne Curtis 
 Rita Daniela  
 Dingdong Dantes 
 Angelika dela Cruz 
 Maybelyn dela Cruz 
 Joshua Desiderio
 Joshua Dionisio 
 Mylene Dizon
 Sunshine Dizon 
 Cogie Domingo 
 Gabby Eigenmann 
 Mart Escudero 
 Brenan Espartinez
 Heart Evangelista 
 Frencheska Farr 
 Barbie Forteza 
 Joross Gamboa
 Maricris Garcia 
 Toni Gonzaga 
 Carlo Guevarra
 Matteo Guidicelli 
 Raymond Gutierrez
 Richard Gutierrez 
 Ruffa Gutierrez 
 Mark Herras 
 Eugene Herrera
 Jerome John Hughes 
 Dion Ignacio 
 Joseph Izon 
 Jay-R 
 Karylle 
 Bianca King 
 Kitty Girls
 Yasmien Kurdi 
 Kyla 
 Kris Lawrence 
 Lilet 
 Angel Locsin 
 Francis Magalona 
 Maxene Magalona 
 Gian Magdangal 
 Jolina Magdangal 
 Malik
 Karel Marquez 
 Jennylyn Mercado 
 Lani Misalucha 
 K. C. Montero 
 Vaness del Moral 
 Champagne Morales 
 Jan Nieto
 Nina 
 Chynna Ortaleza 
 Amanda Page 
 Paolo Paraiso
 Tyron Perez
 Lovi Poe 
 Yassi Pressman 
 Rufa Mae Quinto 
 Radha 
 Jolo Revilla
 Cristine Reyes 
 LJ Reyes 
 Tricia Roman 
 Jake Roxas
 Julie Anne San Jose 
 Aicelle Santos 
 Gerald Santos 
 Danica Sotto 
 Miko Sotto 
 South Border
 Stags
 Miggy Tanchangco
 Antoinette Taus 
 Geoff Taylor 
 Bryan Termulo 
 Dennis Trillo 
 TJ Trinidad
 Brad Turvey 
 Greg Turvey 
 Mo Twister
 Kevin Vernal
 April Villanueva 
 Jonalyn Viray 
 Trina Zuñiga

Ratings
According to AGB Nielsen Philippines' Mega Manila household television ratings, the final episode of SOP scored a 13% rating.

Accolades

References

External links
 

1997 Philippine television series debuts
2010 Philippine television series endings
Filipino-language television shows
GMA Network original programming
Philippine variety television shows